Zinc finger protein 608 is a protein that in humans is encoded by the ZNF608 gene.

References

Further reading 

 
 
 

Genes on human chromosome 5